Economics imperialism is the economic analysis of non-economic aspects of life, such as crime, law, the family,  prejudice, tastes, irrational behavior, politics, sociology, culture,  religion, war, science, and research. Related usage of the term goes back as far as the 1930s.

The emergence of such analysis has been attributed to a method that, like that of the physical sciences, permits refutable implications testable by standard statistical techniques.  Central to that approach are "[t]he combined postulates of maximizing behavior, stable preferences and market equilibrium, applied relentlessly and unflinchingly". It has been asserted that these and a focus on economic efficiency have been ignored in other social sciences and "allowed economics to invade intellectual territory that was previously deemed to be outside the discipline's
realm".

Justin Fox suggests that other social sciences have also made forays into economics, such as psychology with Daniel Kahnemann and Amos Tversky's work on prospect theory, economic anthropology and more recent economic sociology.

See also

 Constitutional economics
 Cultural economics
 Economics of religion
 Economic sociology
 Family economics
 Law and economics
 Public choice theory
 Political economy
 Happiness economics

References

Economic methodology
Interdisciplinary subfields of economics